Đặng Khánh Lâm (born 23 January 1984) is a Vietnamese footballer who plays as a midfielder for V-League club Hải Phòng F.C. and the Vietnam national football team.

References 

1984 births
Living people
Vietnamese footballers
Association football midfielders
V.League 1 players
Xuan Thanh Saigon Cement FC players
Navibank Sài Gòn FC players
Haiphong FC players
People from Hải Dương province
Vietnam international footballers